The 522 Spanish Martyrs were victims of the Spanish Civil War beatified by the Roman Catholic Church on 13 October 2013 by Pope Francis. It was one of the largest number of persons ever beatified in a single ceremony in the Church's 2000-year history. They originated from all parts of Spain. Their ages ranged from 18 to 86 years old.

Ceremony
The ceremonies were held by Cardinal Angelo Amato in Complex Educatiu, Tarragona, Spain. One-third of those beatified served in the Diocese of Tarragona, that is, one hundred forty-seven martyrs, including auxiliary bishop, Manuel Borrás and sixty-six diocesan priests.

Individual fates
The 522 martyrs include three bishops, 82 diocesan priests, three seminarians, 15 priests who belonged to the Brotherhood of Diocesan Priest Workers, 412 religious, and seven laity. They were from all parts of Spain, as well as Colombia, Cuba, the Philippines, and Portugal. The largest group (147) came from Tarragona. L’Osservatore Romano noted that some martyrs were killed in Asturia in 1934, two years before the Spanish Civil War began. The youngest was Jose Sanchez Rodriguez, a Carmelite novice, who was 18 years of age when he was killed against the wall of a cemetery in Madrid at dawn on August 18, 1936. The oldest, Servite Sister Aurora Lopez Gonzalez, was executed aged 86.

The 522 martyrs

The 522 martyrs were advanced in 33 separate causes :
 Mariano Alcala Perez and 18 Companions from the Mercedarian Province of Aragon
 Manuel Basulto Jimenez, Bishop of the Roman Catholic Diocese of Jaén, and 5 Companions from the Diocesan clergy and lay faithful of Jaen
 Manuel Borras Ferre and 146 Companions from the clergy and religious of the Archdiocese of Tarragona
 Raymundo Joaquín Castano Gonzalez, professed priest, Dominicans
 José María Gonzalez Solis, professed priest, Dominicans
 Melchora Adoración Cortes Bueno and 14 Companions from the Daughters of Charity of Saint Vincent de Paul in the Archdiocese of Madrid
 Antonio Faundez Lopez and 3 Companions from the Franciscan Friars Minors and Clergy of the Diocese of Cartagena
 Teófilo Fernandez de Legaria Goni and 4 Companions from the Congregation of the Sacred Hearts of Jesus and Mary (Picpus)
 Ricardo Gil Barcelon, professed priest, Sons of Divine Providence
 Antonio Isidoro Arrue Peiro, layperson of the archdiocese of Valencia; postulant, Sons of Divine Providence
 Crisanto Gonzalez Garcia, Aquilino Baro Riera, Cipriano José Iglesias Banuelos, Guzmán Becerril Merino and 64 Companions from the Marist Brother of the Schools from the Dioceses of Madrid and Cuenca
 María Asumpta Gonzalez Trujillano and 2 Companions from the Franciscan Missionaries of the Mother of the Divine Shepherd
 José Xavier Gorosterratzu Jaunarena and 5 Companions from the Redemptorists of Cuenca
 Joseph Guardiet Pujol, priest of the Archdiocese of Barcelona
 Joan Huguet Cardona, priest of the Diocese of Minorca
 Salvi Huix Miralpéix, priest of the Oratorians; Bishop of Lleida
 Mauricio Iniguez de Heredia Alzola, and 23 Companions from the Hospitallers of Saint John of God of Madrid, Barcelona, Valencia and Malaga
 Hermenegildo Iza Aregita of the Assumption and 5 Companions from the Trinitarians of Ciudad Real
 Joaquín Jovani Marin and 14 Companions from the Diocesan Laborer Priests of Sacred Heart of Jesus
 Alberto María Marco Aleman, Agustín María Garcia Tribaldos and 23 Companions from the Carmelites of the Ancient Observance and the De La Salle Brothers of Madrid
 Josefa Martines Perez and 12 Companions from the Daughters of Charity of Saint Vincent de Paul and lay faithful of Valencia
 José Máximo Moro Briz and 4 Companions from the Diocesan Clergy of Avila
 Carmelo Moyano Linares and 9 Companions from the Carmelites of Ancient Observance of Cordoba
 Joseph Nadal Guiu, priest of the Diocese of Lleida
 José Jordan Blecua, priest of the Diocese of Lleida
 Mauro Palazuelos Maruri and 17 Companions from the Benedictines of El Pueyo
 Jaume Puig Mirosa and 19 Companions from the Sons of the Holy Family and lay faithful of Catalunya
 José María Ruiz Cano, Jesús Aníbal Gomez y Gomez, Tomás Cordero y Cordero and 13 Companions from Siguenza
 Manuel Sanz Dominguez of the Holy Family, professed priest, Hieronymites; restorer
 Orencio Luis Sola Garriga and 19 Companions, along with Antonio Mateo Salamero from De La Salle Brothers, Diocesan Clergy and lay faithful of Madrid
 Victoria Valeverde Gonzalez, professed religious, Calasanzian Institute, Daughters of the Divine Shepherdess
 Fortunato Velasco Tobar and 13 Companions from the Congregation of the Missions (Vincentians)
 Joan of Jesus Vilaregut Farre and 4 Companions from the Discalced Carmelites and the Diocesan Clergy of Urgell
 Mother Aurelia Arambarri Fuente of the Servants of Mary, Ministers of the Sick, was born in Vitoria, Álava, Spain on October 23, 1866. She was appointed Superior of the community of Guanajuato, Mexico, at the time of the Mexican Revolution, and was transferred back to Spain in 1916. By 1934 she suffered from progressive paralysis and lived in the Infirmary of the Motherhouse in Madrid. In July, 1936, the Motherhouse was taken over, and the Sisters had to be dispersed. Mother Aurelia, Sisters Aurora López González, Daría Andiarena Sagaseta, and Augustina Peña Rodríguez were taken in by a family, but were recognized as religious. They died probably on the night of 6 December in Aravaca (Madrid).
 On July 23, 1936, Mother Maria of Montserrat (Josefa Pilar García y Solanas) (64), Mother Margarita of Alacoque of San Ramon, (Raimunda Ors Torrents) (74), Sister Josefa del Purísimo Corazón de Maria (Josefa Panyella and Doménech) (65), Mother Maria of Asuncion (Dolores Vilaseca and Gallego) (65), Sister Trinidad (Teresa Rius and Casas)(61), Sister Maria of San Enrique (Maria Montserrat Ors and Molist) (46), Sister Maria of the Mercedes (Mercedes Mestre Trinché) (47), Sister Filomena of Saint Francis of Paola (Ana Ballesta and Gelmá) (41), and Sister Maria de Jesus (Vicenta Jordá and Martí) (37), of the Minim Nuns of the Monastery of Barcelona were killed.
 Father José María of Manila (Eugenio Sanz-Orozco Mortera), born in the Philippines, was 55 when he was executed on 17 August 1936, at the gardens of the Cuartel de la Montaña, a military building in Madrid. Thirty-one Franciscan Capuchins of Madrid, Asturias, Cantabria, Malaga, and Alicante were also among those martyred during the war.

See also
Martyrs of Daimiel
Martyrs of Turon
233 Spanish Martyrs
498 Spanish Martyrs

References

External links
 Martyrs of Spain, index page
 522 Martyrs in Spain of the 20th Century, at gcath

Martyrs of the Spanish Civil War
20th-century venerated Christians
Spanish beatified people
Beatifications by Pope Francis
Lists of Christian martyrs
Roman Catholic child blesseds
Executed children
Martyred groups
Martyred Roman Catholic priests
Persecution of Christians
Red Terror (Spain)